Chungar may refer to:

Chungar Lake or Chungará Lake, a lake in the Lauca National Park, Chile
Chungar Mine in Peru. Its camp was destroyed and part of the underground workings flooded by a landslide into/tsunami from Yanawayin Lake in March 1971
Eslām Chūngar, a town in Northern Afghanistan